Amata leucerythra is a moth of the family Erebidae. It was described by William Jacob Holland in 1893. It is found in Cameroon, the Democratic Republic of the Congo, Equatorial Guinea and Gabon.

References

 

leucerythra
Moths described in 1893
Moths of Africa